Jane Crabtree (born 31 July 1981) is a badminton player from Australia.

Crabtree competed in badminton at the 2004 Summer Olympics in women's doubles with partner Kate Wilson-Smith. They were defeated by Pernille Harder and Mette Schjoldager of Denmark in the round of 32. Crabtree also competed in the singles at the 2002 Commonwealth Games in Manchester.

References

Australian female badminton players
Badminton players at the 2004 Summer Olympics
Olympic badminton players of Australia
Badminton players at the 2002 Commonwealth Games
Commonwealth Games competitors for Australia
1981 births
Living people
20th-century Australian women
21st-century Australian women